The Train Leaves at Nine (Swedish: Tåget går klockan 9) is a 1941 Swedish comedy film directed by Ivar Johansson and starring Thor Modéen, Torsten Winge and Allan Bohlin. It was shot at the Råsunda Studios in Stockholm. The film's sets were designed by the art director Arne Åkermark.

Cast
 Thor Modéen as 	Oskar Reyner
 Torsten Winge as 	Fredrik Reyner
 Allan Bohlin as 	Thomas Linder
 Gaby Stenberg as Gun Lagerstroem
 Lill-Tollie Zellman as Anne-Marie
 Carl Hagman as 	Werner
 Carl Ström as 	Magnusson
 Sten Lindgren as Edkvist
 Eric Gustafson as 	Sandberg
 Ragnar Widestedt as 	Persson
 John Botvid as 	Police Captain
 Ingrid Envall as Miss Olsson
 David Erikson as 	First Gentleman
 Hartwig Fock as 	Policeman
 Folke Helleberg as 	Policeman
 Eric Laurent as 	Hedberg
 Signe Lundberg-Settergren as 	Mrs. Forsberg
 Helge Mauritz as 	Second Gentleman
 Artur Rolén as Westerlund
 Gösta Bodin as Taxi Driver
 Åke Wedholm as 	Third Gentleman

References

Bibliography 
 Qvist, Per Olov & von Bagh, Peter. Guide to the Cinema of Sweden and Finland. Greenwood Publishing Group, 2000.

External links 
 

1941 films
Swedish comedy films
1941 comedy films
1940s Swedish-language films
Films directed by Ivar Johansson
Swedish black-and-white films
1940s Swedish films